In music, Op. 17 stands for Opus number 17. Compositions that are assigned this number include:

 Adès – Asyla
 Beethoven – Horn Sonata
 Britten – Paul Bunyan
 Busoni – Concerto for Piano and String Quartet
 Chopin – Mazurkas, Op. 17
 Clara Schumann – Piano Trio
 Dvořák – The Stubborn Lovers
 Enescu – Symphony No. 2
 Ginastera – Ollantay
 Hovhaness – Symphony No. 1
 Karetnikov – Symphony No. 4
 Korngold – Piano Concerto for the Left Hand
 Nielsen – Helios Overture
 Oswald – String Quartet No. 2
 Paderewski – Piano Concerto
 Prokofiev – Sarcasms
 Rachmaninoff – Suite No. 2
 Roussel – The Spider's Feast
 Saint-Saëns – Piano Concerto No. 1
 Schoenberg – Erwartung
 Schumann – Fantasie in C
 Sibelius – Seven Songs, Op. 17
 Tchaikovsky – Symphony No. 2
 Wieniawski – Légende
 Zemlinsky – Der Zwerg